Cephonodes woodfordii is a moth of the  family Sphingidae. It is known from Papua New Guinea, the Louisiade Archipelago and the Solomon Islands.

It is very similar to Cephonodes hylas hylas but larger and immediately distinguishable by the orange (not white) underside of the thorax. The underside of the head, thorax and legs are orange. The underside of the abdomen is black with small orange lateral and medial patches on each sternite. The anal tuft is largely black.

Subspecies
Cephonodes woodfordii woodfordii
Cephonodes woodfordii luisae Rothschild & Jordan, 1903 (Papua New Guinea)

References

Cephonodes
Moths described in 1889